The 1954 Rhode Island Rams football team was an American football team that represented the University of Rhode Island as a member of the Yankee Conference during the 1954 college football season. In its fourth season under head coach Hal Kopp, the team compiled a 6–2 record (3–1 against conference opponents), finished second out of six teams in the Yankee Conference, and outscored opponents by a total of 164 to 111. The team played its home games at Meade Stadium in Kingston, Rhode Island.

Schedule

References

Rhode Island
Rhode Island Rams football seasons
Rhode Island Rams football